Amphinemura linda is a species of spring stonefly in the family Nemouridae.  It is found in North America.

References

Further reading

 
 

Nemouridae